Dmytro Yuriyovych Mytrofanov (born 8 November 1989) is a Ukrainian middleweight professional boxer. He won the national title in 2008 and 2012 and a bronze medal at the 2011 European Championships. He competed at the 2016 Olympics, but was eliminated in the first bout.

Career
Mytrofanov was raised as an orphan – his mother died two months after his birth. His father soon remarried and left Dmytro with his grandparents, who both died by the time he entered a boarding school. Mytrofanov took up boxing in 2001, and in 2008 won his first national championship (It was held after the 2008 Olympics and was not an Olympic selection). His professional debut was made on 27 October 2017 with fight against an American boxer Brandon Maddox.

Professional boxing record

References

External links
 
 

1989 births
Living people
Ukrainian male boxers
Olympic boxers of Ukraine
Boxers at the 2016 Summer Olympics
Sportspeople from Chernihiv
Universiade medalists in boxing
Universiade gold medalists for Ukraine
Middleweight boxers
Medalists at the 2013 Summer Universiade